Two-photon absorption (TPA or 2PA) or two-photon excitation or non-linear absorption is the simultaneous absorption of two photons of identical or different frequencies in order to excite a molecule from one state (usually the ground state) to a higher energy, most commonly an excited electronic state. Absorption of two photons with different frequencies is called non-degenerate two-photon absorption. Since TPA depends on the simultaneous absorption of two photons, the probability of TPA is proportional to the square of the light intensity, thus it is a nonlinear optical process. The energy difference between the involved lower and upper states of the molecule is equal or smaller than the sum of the photon energies of the two photons absorbed. Two-photon absorption is a third-order process, with absorption cross section typically several orders of magnitude smaller than one-photon absorption cross section.

Two-photon excitation of a fluorophore (a fluorescent molecule) leads to two-photon-excited fluorescence where the excited state produced by TPA decays by spontaneous emission of a photon to a lower energy state.

Background 
The phenomenon was originally predicted by Maria Goeppert-Mayer in 1931 in her doctoral dissertation. Thirty years later, the invention of the laser permitted the first experimental verification of TPA when two-photon-excited fluorescence was detected in a europium-doped crystal. Soon afterwards, the effect was observed in cesium vapor and then in CdS, a semiconductor.

TPA is a nonlinear optical process. In particular, the imaginary part of the third-order nonlinear susceptibility is related to the extent of TPA in a given molecule. The selection rules for TPA are therefore different from one-photon absorption (OPA), which is dependent on the first-order susceptibility. The relationship between the selection rules for one- and two-photon absorption is analogous to those of Raman and IR spectroscopies. For example, in a centrosymmetric molecule, one- and two-photon allowed transitions are mutually exclusive, an optical transition allowed in one of the spectroscopies is forbidden in the other. However, for non-centrosymmetric molecules there is no formal mutual exclusion between the selection rules for OPA and TPA.   In quantum mechanical terms, this difference results from the fact that the quantum states of such molecules have either + or - inversion symmetry, usually labelled by g (for +) and u (for -).  One photon transitions are only allowed between states that differ in the inversion symmetry, i.e. g <-> u, while two photon transitions are only allowed between states that have the same inversion symmetry, i.e. g <-> g and u <-> u.

The relation between the number of photons - or, equivalently, order of the electronic transitions - involved in a TPA process (two) and the order of the corresponding nonlinear susceptibility (three) may be understood using the optical theorem. This theorem relates the imaginary part of an all-optical process of a given perturbation order  with a process involving charge carriers with half the perturbation order, i.e. .

Phenomenologically, TPA can be thought of as the third term in a conventional anharmonic oscillator model for depicting vibrational behavior of molecules. Another view is to think of light as photons. In nonresonant TPA, neither photon is at resonance with the system energy gap, and two photons combine to bridge the energy gap larger than the energies of each photon individually. If there were an intermediate electronic state in the gap, this could happen via two separate one-photon transitions in a process described as "resonant TPA", "sequential TPA", or "1+1 absorption" where the absorption alone is a first order process and the generated fluorescence will rise as the square of the incoming intensity. In nonresonant TPA the transition occurs without the presence of the intermediate state. This can be viewed as being due to a "virtual" state created by the interaction of the photons with the molecule. The virtual state argument is quite orthogonal to the anharmonic oscillator argument. It states for example that in a semiconductor, absorption at high energies is impossible if two photons cannot bridge the band gap. So, many materials can be used for the Kerr effect that do not show any absorption and thus have a high damage threshold.

The "nonlinear" in the description of this process means that the strength of the interaction increases faster than linearly with the electric field of the light. In fact, under ideal conditions the rate of TPA is proportional to the square of the field intensity. This dependence can be derived quantum mechanically, but is intuitively obvious when one considers that it requires two photons to coincide in time and space. This requirement for high light intensity means that lasers are required to study TPA phenomena. Further, in order to understand the TPA spectrum, monochromatic light is also desired in order to measure the TPA cross section at different wavelengths. Hence, tunable pulsed lasers (such as frequency-doubled Nd:YAG-pumped OPOs and OPAs) are the choice of excitation.

Measurements 
Two-photon absorption can be measured by several techniques. Some of them are two-photon excited fluorescence (TPEF), z-scan, self-diffraction or nonlinear transmission (NLT). Pulsed lasers are most often used because TPA is a third-order nonlinear optical process, and therefore is most efficient at very high intensities.

Absorption rate 
Beer's law describes the decay in intensity due to one-photon absorption:

In two-photon absorption, for an incident plane wave of radiation, the light intensity versus distance changes to

for TPA with light intensity as a function of path length or cross section  as a function of concentration  and the initial light intensity . The absorption coefficient  now becomes the TPA coefficient . (Note that there is some confusion over the term  in nonlinear optics, since it is sometimes used to describe the second-order polarizability, and occasionally for the molecular two-photon cross-section. More often however, it is used to describe the bulk 2-photon optical density of a sample.

Two-photon excited fluorescence

Relation between the two-photon excited fluorescence and the total number of absorbed photons per unit time  is given by

In a particular measurement,  is a function of fluorophore concentration , illuminated sample volume , incident light intensity , and two-photon absorption cross-section :

Units of cross-section 
The molecular two-photon absorption cross-section is usually quoted in the units of Goeppert-Mayer (GM) (after its discoverer, Nobel laureate Maria Goeppert-Mayer), where 1 GM is 10−50 cm4 s photon−1. Considering the reason for these units, one can see that it results from the product of two areas (one for each photon, each in cm2) and a time (within which the two photons must arrive to be able to act together). The large scaling factor is introduced in order that 2-photon absorption cross-sections of common dyes will have convenient values.

Development of the field and potential applications 
Until the early 1980s, TPA was used as a spectroscopic tool. Scientists compared the OPA and TPA spectra of different organic molecules and obtained several fundamental structure property relationships. However, in late 1980s, applications started to be developed. Peter Rentzepis suggested applications in 3D optical data storage. Watt Webb suggested microscopy and imaging. Other applications such as 3D microfabrication, optical logic, autocorrelation, pulse reshaping and optical power limiting were also demonstrated.

3D imaging of semiconductors 
It was demonstrated that by using 2-photon absorption charge carriers can be generated spatially confined in a semiconductor device. This can be used to investigate the charge transport properties of such device.

Microfabrication and lithography 
One of the most distinguishing features of TPA is that the rate of absorption of light by a molecule depends on the square of the light's intensity. This is different from OPA, where the rate of absorption is linear with respect to input intensity. As a result of this dependence, if material is cut with a high power laser beam, the rate of material removal decreases very sharply from the center of the beam to its periphery. Because of this, the "pit" created is sharper and better resolved than if the same size pit were created using normal absorption.

3D photopolymerization 

In 3D microfabrication, a block of gel containing monomers and a 2-photon active photoinitiator is prepared as a raw material. Application of a focused laser to the block results in polymerization only at the focal spot of the laser, where the intensity of the absorbed light is highest. The shape of an object can therefore be traced out by the laser, and then the excess gel can be washed away to leave the traced solid.

Imaging 
The human body is not transparent to visible wavelengths. Hence, one photon imaging using fluorescent dyes is not very efficient. If the same dye had good two-photon absorption, then the corresponding excitation would occur at approximately two times the wavelength at which one-photon excitation would have occurred. As a result, it is possible to use excitation in the far infrared region where the human body shows good transparency.

It is sometimes said, incorrectly, that Rayleigh scattering is relevant to imaging techniques such as two-photon. As a result, if the wavelength is increased by a factor of 2, the Rayleigh scattering is reduced by a factor of 16. However, Rayleigh scattering only takes place when scattering particles are much smaller than the wavelength of light (the sky is blue because air molecules scatter blue light much more than red light). When particles are larger, scattering increases approximately linearly with wavelength: hence clouds are white since they contain water droplets. This form of scatter is known as Mie scattering and is what occurs in biological tissues. So, although longer wavelengths do scatter less in biological tissues, the difference is not as dramatic as Rayleigh's law would predict.

Optical power limiting 
Another area of research is optical power limiting. In a material with a strong nonlinear effect, the absorption of light increases with intensity such that beyond a certain input intensity the output intensity approaches a constant value. Such a material can be used to limit the amount of optical power entering a system. This can be used to protect expensive or sensitive equipment such as sensors, can be used in protective goggles, or can be used to control noise in laser beams.

Photodynamic therapy 
Photodynamic therapy (PDT) is a method for treating cancer. In this technique, an organic molecule with a good triplet quantum yield is excited so that the triplet state of this molecule interacts with oxygen. The ground state of oxygen has triplet character. This leads to triplet-triplet annihilation, which gives rise to singlet oxygen, which in turn attacks cancerous cells. However, using TPA materials, the window for excitation can be extended into the infrared region, thereby making the process more viable to be used on the human body.

Two-photon pharmacology 
Photoisomerization of azobenzene-based pharmacological ligands by 2-photon absorption has been described for use in photopharmacology. It allows controlling the activity of endogenous proteins in intact tissue with pharmacological selectivity in three dimensions. It can be used to study neural circuits and to develop drug-based non invasive phototherapies.

Optical data storage 
The ability of two-photon excitation to address molecules deep within a sample without affecting other areas makes it possible to store and retrieve information in the volume of a substance rather than only on a surface as is done on the DVD. Therefore, 3D optical data storage has the possibility to provide media that contain terabyte-level data capacities on a single disc.

Compounds 
To some extent, linear and 2-photon absorption strengths are linked. Therefore, the first compounds to be studied (and many that are still studied and used in e.g. 2-photon microscopy) were standard dyes. In particular, laser dyes were used, since these have good photostability characteristics. However, these dyes tend to have 2-photon cross-sections of the order of 0.1–10 GM, much less than is required to allow simple experiments.

It was not until the 1990s that rational design principles for the construction of two-photon-absorbing molecules began to be developed, in response to a need from imaging and data storage technologies, and aided by the rapid increases in computer power that allowed quantum calculations to be made. The accurate quantum mechanical analysis of two-photon absorbance is orders of magnitude more computationally intensive than that of one-photon absorbance, requiring highly correlated calculations at very high levels of theory.

The most important features of strongly TPA molecules were found to be a long conjugation system (analogous to a large antenna) and substitution by strong donor and acceptor groups (which can be thought of as inducing nonlinearity in the system and increasing the potential for charge-transfer). Therefore, many push-pull olefins exhibit high TPA transitions, up to several thousand GM. It is also found that compounds with a real intermediate energy level close to the "virtual" energy level can have large 2-photon cross-sections as a result of resonance enhancement. There are several databases of two-photon absorption spectra available online.

Compounds with interesting TPA properties also include various porphyrin derivatives, conjugated polymers and even dendrimers. In one study  a diradical resonance contribution for the compound depicted below was also linked to efficient TPA. The TPA wavelength for this compound is 1425 nanometer with observed TPA cross section of 424 GM.

Coefficients 
The two-photon absorption coefficient is defined by the relation

so that

The SI units of the beta coefficient are m/W. If  (m/W) is multiplied by 10−9 it can be converted to the CGS system (cal/cm s/erg).

Due to different laser pulses the TPA coefficients reported has differed as much as a factor 3. With the transition towards shorter laser pulses, from
picosecond to subpicosecond durations, noticeably reduced TPA coefficient have been obtained.

In water 
Laser induced TPA in water was discovered in 1980.

Water absorbs UV radiation near 125 nm exiting the 3a1 orbital leading to dissociation into OH− and H+. Through TPA this dissociation can be achieved by two photons near 266 nm. Since water and heavy water have different vibration frequencies and inertia they also need different photon energies to achieve dissociation and have different absorption coefficients for a given photon wavelength.
A study from Jan 2002 used a femtosecond laser tuned to 0.22 Picoseconds found the coefficient of D2O to be 42±5 10−11(cm/W) whereas H2O was 49±5 10−11(cm/W).

Two-photon emission 
The opposite process of TPA is two-photon emission (TPE), which is a single electron transition accompanied by the emission of a photon pair. The energy of each individual photon of the pair is not determined, while the pair as a whole conserves the transition energy. The spectrum of TPE is therefore very broad and continuous. TPE in condensed matter and specifically in semiconductors was only first observed in 2008, with emission rates nearly 5 orders of magnitude weaker than one-photon spontaneous emission, with potential applications in quantum information.

See also 
 Two-photon circular dichroism
 Two-photon excitation microscopy
 Virtual particles are in virtual state where the probability amplitude is not conserved.

References

External links 
 Web-based calculator for the rate of 2-photon absorption

Nonlinear optics